Albert Howcroft (27 December 1882 – 7 March 1955) was an English cricketer who played for Derbyshire in 1908 and 1910.

Howcroft was born in Cliffe, Yorkshire. He made his debut for Derbyshire in the 1908 season, in May against  Surrey, when he scored 19 during the second innings, having been caught out in the first. His second appearance came a week later against Sussex, but he made little impact. He next played for Derbyshire in the 1910 season, playing two games. His final first-class game was against Leicestershire when  Ernest Needham and Leonard Oliver both scored first-innings centuries for a Derbyshire victory. Howcroft was a left-handed lower-order batsman and played 8 innings in four first-class matches. His best score was his debut 19 and his average 5.75.

Howcroft died at Belper, Derbyshire at the age of 73.

References

1882 births
1955 deaths
English cricketers
Derbyshire cricketers